Opole is an unincorporated community in Brockway Township, Stearns County, Minnesota, United States.  The community is located along Stearns County Road 17 near 125th Avenue.  Stearns County Road 3 is also in the immediate area.  Nearby places include Holdingford, St. Stephen, and Rice.

References

Unincorporated communities in Stearns County, Minnesota
Unincorporated communities in Minnesota
Polish-American culture in Minnesota